Alexander Choupenitch (born 2 May 1994) is a Czech right-handed foil fencer, two-time Olympian, and 2021 individual Olympic bronze medalist.

Personal life
Choupenitch is the son of Belarusian-born opera singers who both worked at National Theatre Brno. The unusual form of his name–Choupenitch instead of Šupenič–is due to the fact that papers issued to his parents for travelling through Europe used a French spelling.

His first sport, basketball, left him frustrated as he seldom got to touch the ball, so his mother took him to the fencing section of Sokol Brno when he was eight. He later learnt that his step-grandmother, Tatyana Petrenko-Samusenko, was a three-time Olympic foil champion for the USSR. Foil was the only option offered at the club, but he later explained that foil is indeed his favourite weapon, being the more realistic and striking the best balance between sabre's speed and épée's tactics. His first coach was Dmitri Romankov, who also trained Belarusian fencer Siarhei Byk.

Choupenitch's other favourite sports are association football and ice hockey. He also plays the piano. He interrupted his studies at the Masaryk University in Brno to focus on sport. In April 2015 he gained a sponsorship from Red Bull.

Career
Choupenitch won his first international distinctions in 2011 with a gold medal at the Cadet European Championships in Klagenfurt and a bronze medal in the Cadet World Championships at the Dead Sea. As a junior, he earned the silver medal in the 2012 Junior World Championships in Poreč and won the Junior World Cup the same year. The next season, he took the silver medal in the Junior European Championships in Budapest and a bronze medal in the World Championships in Poreč; he also finished first of the Junior World Cup for the second year in a row. He won in 2014 the Junior European Championships in Jerusalem and earned a silver medal in the Junior World Championships in Plovdiv after losing the final to China's Chen Haiwei.

Choupenitch also fences as a senior since 2010–11. For his first participation in the World Championships in Catania in 2011 he was eliminated in the first round by Japan's Yuki Ota. At the age of 17 he aimed for the 2012 Summer Olympics in London, but he was defeated by Romania's Radu Dărăban in the quarter-finals of the qualifying tournament in Bratislava.

At the beginning of the 2013–14 season Choupenitch transferred from Sokol Brno to CS Fides in Livorno, Italy, to train under Paolo Paoletti. He reached the final at the A Coruña World Cup before being defeated by China's Ma Jianfei and ended up with a silver medal. His victory during the tournament over Olympic champion Andrea Baldini encouraged him to believe he could become a champion in his own right. A few weeks later he lost again against Ma in the Venice Grand Prix, this time in the semi-final, and took a bronze medal. In the European Championships at Strasbourg, he reached the quarter-finals, but was defeated 13–15 by Great Britain's James-Andrew Davis, who eventually won the gold medal. At the World Championships in Kazan, he lost in the quarter-finals to China's Ma Jianfei, who eventually won the silver medal. Choupenitch finished the season No.5 in world rankings, gaining 76 ranks compared to 2012–13 season.

In the 2014–15 season Choupenitch won a silver medal at the Shanghai Grand Prix, losing in the final to the USA's Miles Chamley-Watson.

Medal Record

Olympic Games

European Championship

Grand Prix

World Cup

References

External links 

 
  (archive)
 
 
 
 Profile at Redbull.com

1994 births
Living people
Sportspeople from Brno
Czech people of Belarusian descent
Czech male fencers
Olympic fencers of the Czech Republic
Fencers at the 2010 Summer Youth Olympics
Fencers at the 2016 Summer Olympics
Fencers at the 2020 Summer Olympics
European Games competitors for the Czech Republic
Fencers at the 2015 European Games
Medalists at the 2020 Summer Olympics
Olympic bronze medalists for the Czech Republic
Olympic medalists in fencing